James Kash Beauchamp (born January 8, 1963 in Grove, Oklahoma) is an American professional baseball coach. He is currently the manager for the Ogden Raptors of the Pioneer Baseball League.

Career
Beauchamp is the son of late Major League Baseball player Jim Beauchamp. Beauchamp attended Grove High School in Oklahoma and then Bacone College.

Beauchamp played 12 seasons in the minors, seeing moderate success but never reaching the Majors, although he did get as high as Triple-A. He displayed good speed at the beginning of his professional career, stealing as many as 25 bases in a season, although as his career went on he stole less and less each year.

In 1984, he was the MVP of the Carolina League All-Star Game, going 5-for-6 with a home run, two triples and five RBI. He was voted Best Defensive Outfielder and Outfielder With the Best Arm that year by Baseball America.

Beauchamp was the first player to be signed to a professional (major league affiliated) contract out of the independent leagues when, after hitting .367 with the Rochester Aces of the Northern League in 1993, he was signed by the Cincinnati Reds.

He ended his playing career in 1995, and afterward he began managing and coaching various teams in different independent leagues. From 1995 to 1997, he was a hitting coach in the Montreal Expos farm system. From 1998 to 2000, he managed the New Jersey Jackals of the Northeast League. He managed the Lincoln Saltdogs in 2001 and then the Adirondack Lumberjacks for the next three seasons. He didn't manage in 2005, instead serving as the scouting director for the Golden Baseball League. During his time with the Golden League he was picked up as hitting coach for the Samurai Bears. He also had a role in the movie Season of the Samurai. He managed the Pensacola Pelicans of the American Association in 2006. In 2007, he served as Vice President/Director of Baseball Operations for the South Coast League. He also served as manager of the league's Anderson Joes franchise for the final 37 games of the 2007 season. Beauchamp left both positions in November 2007 to become manager of the Wichita Wingnuts of the American Association.

On July 9, 2008, Beauchamp had a major tirade, taking off his shoe and trying to make the umpire smell his shoe along with his armpit; he received a four-game suspension for his actions. His extreme emotional blowup, arguing the controversial call on behalf of his players, received national attention via major television networks and has become something of an internet sensation. At the end of the 2008 season, the Wingnuts decided not to retain Beauchamp as their manager.

Beauchamp was hired as the Arizona Diamondbacks’ Independent League Scout in 2017, and retained that role through the 2019 season.

In 2018, Beauchamp served as the hitting coach for the Southern Maryland Blue Crabs of the Atlantic League of Professional Baseball.

In November 2019, Beauchamp was hired as the hitting coach for the Winnipeg Goldeyes in the American Association of Independent Professional Baseball, serving in that role for two seasons.

On November 23, 2021, the Ogden Raptors announced the hiring of Beauchamp as their next manager.

Notes

References

1963 births
Living people
Albuquerque Dukes players
American expatriate baseball players in Canada
Baseball coaches from Oklahoma
Baseball outfielders
Baseball players from Oklahoma
Bacone Warriors baseball players
Chattanooga Lookouts players
Edmonton Trappers players
Florence Blue Jays players
Greenville Braves players
Kinston Blue Jays players
Knoxville Blue Jays players
Lincoln Saltdogs players
Medicine Hat Blue Jays players
Minor league baseball managers
New Jersey Jackals players
People from Grove, Oklahoma
Phoenix Firebirds players
Richmond Braves players
Rochester Aces players
San Antonio Missions players
Shreveport Captains players
Syracuse Chiefs players
Yuma Bullfrogs players